Susie Singer Carter is an American film director and actress. She is best known for her work on My Mom and the Girl, Soul Surfer, Bratz, Cake and Dance Revolution.

Life and career
Susie was born in Los Angeles, California. She was majored in communication at University of California, Los Angeles and began writing for the Daily Bruin.

Susie began her career by writing and producing Dance Revolution and Cake for CBS. In 2007, she wrote and produced Bratz for Lionsgate but lost her credit in a Writers Guild arbitration, though her name appears as screenwriter on the final movie poster. In 2011 she co-produced Soul Surfer and penned the screenplay for the animated musical Twinkle Toes Lights Up New York. In 2016 she wrote, produced, directed and acted the short film My Mom and the Girl starring Valerie Harper, which won awards in Cleveland International Film Festival, Pittsburgh short film festival and Oscar qualified.
Susie wrote and directed two documentaries, Breaking Good and Women Who Wrote the Way and it was premiered at the Writers Guild of America for Women's History Month in 2018. She is a member of the Alliance of Women Directors. she has 2 daughters

Filmography

As Actress

References

External links 
 

Living people
American women film directors
American women screenwriters
1975 births
21st-century American women